L'Auberge du Pont de Collonges, also known as Paul Bocuse or Bocuse, is a restaurant in Collonges-au-Mont-d'Or near Lyon, France. The chef was Paul Bocuse.

Chef Paul Bocuse died on 20 January 2018 in the same room above his restaurant in which he was born in 1926.

The restaurant lost its 3-star rating in the 2020 Michelin Guide after holding it for a record 55 years (since 1965).

References

External links

Michelin Guide starred restaurants in France